Aleksandar Ćovin (Serbian Cyrillic: Александар Ћовин; born 23 November 1988) is a Serbian former footballer.

References

External links
 Stats at Utakmica.rs

1988 births
Living people
Sportspeople from Subotica
Serbian footballers
Association football midfielders
Serbian expatriate footballers
Expatriate footballers in Belarus
Expatriate footballers in Bosnia and Herzegovina
Serbian SuperLiga players
FK Hajduk Kula players
FK Radnički Sombor players
FK TSC Bačka Topola players
FC Slavia Mozyr players
FK Sloboda Užice players
FK Proleter Novi Sad players
FK Mladost Velika Obarska players